Romania participated in the Eurovision Song Contest 2005 in Kyiv, Ukraine. They selected their entry, "Let Me Try" by Romanian singer Luminița Anghel and group Sistem, through the national selection Selecția Națională 2005 in March 2005. Controversy surrounded the event, as second-placed singer Loredana accused the organising broadcaster, Romanian Television (TVR), of vote rigging. Prior to the 2005 contest, Romania had participated in the Eurovision Song Contest seven times since its first entry in 1994. Its highest placing in the contest, to this point, had been ninth place, which the nation achieved in 2002. In 2004, they placed 18th in the final.

Prior to Eurovision, "Let Me Try" was promoted by a music video and coverage in press, among other endeavours by TVR. Romania reached first place in the contest's semi-final with 235 points. This resulted in its qualification for the Grand Final, where it achieved third place with 158 points. This remains the country's best result in the contest, alongside 2010's entry. During Romania's show, Anghel performed to the song in front of Sistem, who contributed to the track's instrumentation by drumming on oil barrels and using side cutters and a grinding wheel. Following Eurovision, "Let Me Try" achieved commercial success in Romania, peaking at number nine on the Romanian Top 100. In addition, Anghel's participation in the contest led to record deal proposals from various countries including the Netherlands, Hungary, Germany and England.

Before Eurovision

Selecția Națională 2005
The Romanian Television (TVR) organized the Selecția Națională 2005 on 5 March 2005, a national final to select Romania's entrant for the Eurovision Song Contest 2005.

Competing entries 
Out of all submitted songs, a jury panel decided on 12 finalists; the music videos to their entries were broadcast on 4 March during TVR's Stele de... Eurovision programme hosted by Mihăluș and Mugurel Vrabete.

Final 
The final was held on 5 March 2005 at the TVR Studioul 1 from 20:00 to 23:00 EET, it was hosted by Laura Mihăluș and Dan Bittman.  In the final, the televoting and jury scores were combined, with the televoting having a 25% weighting of the overall result. The 12-member panel was made up of Horia Moculescu, Titus Munteanu, Daniel Alexandrescu, Crina Mărdare, Oltea Șerban Pârău, Berti Barbera, Vlad Crețu, Adi Despot, Eugen Mihăescu, Dan Manoliu, Andrei Kerestely and Cătalin Tuță Popescu. The three songs attracting the most televotes were "Let Me Try" by Luminița Anghel and Sistem (10,832), "Le Le" by Loredana (3,871) and "All the Time" by Nico and Mihai Trăistariu (3,439). The jury's top two was "Le Le" (135 points) and "Let Me Try" (134 points); the first was awarded the top 12 points mark seven times. Overall, "Let Me Try" won the Selecția Națională with a total of 206 points, followed by "Le Le" (201 points) and "All the Time" (174 points). The full results were:

Controversy 

The selection competition saw some controversial events. Nicolae Dinescu, the drummer of the band Juke Box, died on the morning prior to the contest of a heart attack; the group still decided to compete in the contest. Larger controversy came following the winner's announcement, when second-placed Loredana accused TVR of vote rigging. She suggested that this was done because she did not want to sign a contract with the broadcaster that related to the copyright of her song, basing the accusation on reports that her voting line was continuously busy and so people were unable to vote for her when they called. The newspaper Jurnalul Național agreed with the singer's thoughts, seeing her as the real winner. According to the publication, the jury votes and the televoting were not added up correctly.

Promotion
TVR promoted Anghel and Sistem as Romania's entrants for the Eurovision Song Contest with tours abroad and in Romanian communities in Europe. They also had coverage in Romanian diaspora press and on various Romanian and international websites, as well as on radio stations and in European clubs. In addition, TVR sent supporting e-mails to all addresses stored on their server. A music video for "Let Me Try" was released in 2005 and included on an enhanced CD release of the single that year. It features Anghel performing to the song while Sistem drums on barrels in a desert.

At Eurovision
The Eurovision Song Contest 2005 took place at the Palace of Sports in Kyiv, Ukraine and consisted of one semi-final on 19 May, and the final on 21 May 2005. In Romania, the show was aired on TVR, with Dan Manoliu as the country's head of delegation. Anghel and Sistem were scheduled for technical rehearsals on 13 and 15 May. After negotiations, TVR was granted the permission to use flames projected on the background LED screen and a grinding wheel during Romania's performance, although real flames onstage and the use of staves were prohibited. They were, though, allowed to use oil barrels; these had to be brought onstage by special platforms with wheels. Twenty people were needed for the barrel positioning, which occurred in around 40 seconds during set change and cost 3,000 euros.

According to the Eurovision rules at the time, selected countries, except the host country and the "Big Four" (France, Germany, Spain and the United Kingdom), were required to qualify from the semi-final to compete for the final; the top ten countries from the semi-final progressed to the final. In the semi-final, Anghel and Sistem performed 14th, preceded by Norway and followed by Hungary. In the Grand Final, they sang fourth, preceded by Malta and followed by Norway. The show consisted of Anghel performing the song, wearing a green top with a pair of jeans, in front of Sistem, who contributed to the track's instrumentation by "wildly" drumming on oil barrels in a similar way to German industrial band Einstürzende Neubauten. While the singer joined the group during an instrumental part, Sistem also used side cutters and a grinding wheel to create what a Eurovision.de writer described as "spark rain" onstage.

Voting
Below is a breakdown of points awarded to and by Romania in the semi-final and Grand Final of the contest. In the semi-final, the country finished in first place with a total of 235 points, including ten from Austria, Malta and Portugal, and 12 from Cyprus, Spain, Greece, Hungary, Israel and Moldova. In the Grand Final, Romania finished in third position, being awarded a total of 158 points, including ten awarded by Hungary and 12 by Spain, Israel and Portugal. This remains the country's best result in the contest, matched in 2010 with their entry "Playing with Fire" by Paula Seling and Ovi. Romania awarded its 12 points to Moldova in both the semi-final and Grand Final of the contest. For the Grand Final points announcement, Berti Barbera was the Romanian spokesperson announcing the country's voting results.

Points awarded to Romania

Points awarded by Romania

References

2005
Countries in the Eurovision Song Contest 2005
Eurovision
Eurovision